La Morera de Montsant is a village in the province of Tarragona and autonomous community of Catalonia, Spain.

Geography
It is located in the mountainous wine-producing region of the Serra de Montsant thus named because there were many hermits living in the range in early Medieval times.

The municipality has two villages:
La Morera de Montsant, the main population centre
Escaladei, located by the Cartoixa d'Escaladei, a Carthusian Order monastery.

References

External links
 Government data pages 

Municipalities in Priorat